KPZK-FM (102.5 FM, better known locally as Praise Radio) plays a gospel format in the Little Rock metropolitan area. It is under ownership of The Last Bastion Station Trust, LLC.  The station's studios are located in West Little Rock, and the transmitter tower is located in Cabot.

Former sister station KPZK (at 1250 AM), which initially shared its call sign, remained with Citadel Broadcasting (now part of Cumulus Media) when KPZK-FM & another former sister station (now KVLO) were transferred to the trust. KPZK (AM) has simulcast another Cumulus station, KIPR, ever since; it changed its call sign to KFOG in 2019 to warehouse the historic call sign of a Cumulus station in San Francisco.

On July 3, 2012, KVLO split from its simulcast with KPZK-FM and changed to an adult hits format.

References

External links
Official website

PZK-FM